Gregory V served as Greek Patriarch of Alexandria for two years, between 1484 and 1486.

References

15th-century Patriarchs of Alexandria